The Bachelors were a popular music group, originating from Dublin, Ireland, but primarily based in the United Kingdom. They had several international hits during the 1960s, including eight top-ten singles in the UK between 1963 and 1966.

Career
The founding members of the group were Conleth (Con) Cluskey (18 November 1935 – 8 April 2022), his younger brother Declan (Dec) Cluskey (born 23 December 1941), and their friend John Stokes (Sean James Stokes) (born 13 August 1936). They formed their first band together in 1957: "The Harmonichords" (also seen as "The Harmony Chords"), a classically styled instrumental harmonica-act.

As the Harmonichords, they appeared on Hughie Green's Opportunity Knocks on Radio Luxembourg and on The Ed Sullivan Show St. Patrick's Day special (filmed in Dublin, broadcast 15 March 1959), in which they played "Danny Boy". They also played background music plus featured pieces in a 25-week radio comedy series called Odd Noises on Radio Éireann, which featured Eamonn Andrews. In 1960, they changed their name to the Bachelors at the suggestion of Dick Rowe, A&R at Decca Records, who reportedly recommended the name "because that's the kind of boy a girl likes".

During the 1960s, they had many successful songs in music charts in Europe, Australia, South Africa, South America, parts of the USSR, and the United States. Some of the most successful were "Charmaine" (1963); "Diane", "I Believe" (1964), "Ramona" and "I Wouldn't Trade You for the World" (1964); "Marie" (written by Irving Berlin) and "In the Chapel in the Moonlight" (1965). In 1965 they had the 'most played juke box track' with "The Stars Will Remember", from the film  "It's all over town". Their last big hit in the UK was a cover of the Paul Simon song "The Sound of Silence" which reached No. 3 in April 1966.

Live work carried them into the 1970s with record-breaking theatre season shows. After a successful end to the 1960s with the album World of the Bachelors hitting the top 10 in 1968, the band became less and less dominant in the changing music industry. They remained successful recording artists and moved to the Philips label, which contracted easy listening stars such as Val Doonican and The New Seekers. Despite the Bachelors' last chart single being in 1967, they continued to play the cabaret circuit, still maintaining the original line-up until 1984, when there was "a messy split" between the Cluskey brothers and Stokes.

Following the split, the Cluskey brothers appeared as "The New Bachelors" and Stokes as "Stokes & Coe"; Stokes allegedly also then appeared as "The New Bachelors"
and the Cluskeys performed as "Con & Dec, The Bachelors".

In 2008, a compilation CD I Believe – The Very Best of The Bachelors, featuring the 1960s hits together with two new songs recorded by Con and Dec Cluskey, was released through Universal, which had acquired the Decca catalogue, (available in the US as an import from Uni Classics Jazz UK), reached No. 7 in the UK album chart. Con and Dec Cluskey appeared on TV and radio to promote the album.

Con Cluskey died on 8 April 2022, aged 86. He had been living in Elland, West Yorkshire, since 1970.

Film and television
Throughout the 1960s, the Bachelors racked up hit singles and albums, made guest appearances on all the then-current TV shows, and appeared in two Royal Variety TV shows. In 1963, they starred in It's All Over Town with Frankie Vaughan and The Springfields. The following year they appeared on the TV show Sunday Night at the London Palladium, then hosted by Bruce Forsyth: this episode, according to Paul Gambaccini, achieved the largest viewing audience ever for this very popular show.

The Bachelors appeared in a film in 1964 called Just for You (known as "Disk-o-Tek Holiday in the USA), with DJ Sam Costa. In 1965 they made I've Gotta Horse with Billy Fury. In 1971 they starred in a TV situation comedy series called Under and Over playing three Irish navvies working on the London Underground. Six episodes were broadcast on BBC One.

The group began 1970 by appearing on the BBC's highly rated review of the 1960s' music scene Pop Go The Sixties performing "Charmaine" and "Diane" live on the show, which was broadcast on BBC1 on 1 January 1970.

In December 2016, Con and Dec (performing as The Bachelors) appeared in Channel 4's Skeg Vegas, a one-off documentary following Skegness' Number One Entertainment Agent Noel Gee.

Songs
The Bachelors' version of "Charmaine", with its descending melody that had already made it an evergreen, jogs along to a country guitar strum and a sprinkling of piano licks. Dick Rowe chose American Shel Talmy as record producer, who went on to produce some of The Kinks' classic rock hits. Another 1927 movie theme song, "Diane"—penned by the same songwriters as "Charmaine", Erno Rapee and Lew Pollack, and arranged in the same Nashville-like manner, but produced by Michael Barclay—was released in 1964 and gave the group their biggest international hit, reaching number one in the UK Singles Chart, as well as an American breakthrough at number ten.

Four of their hit songs ("Charmaine","Ramona","Marie" and "Diane") were taken from 1920s films. Jim Reeves had also covered the first three of these in the 1950s.

Discography

Single releases

Extended play (EP) releases

Albums
The Bachelors and 16 Great Songs (1964) – UK No. 2
No Arms Can Ever Hold You (1965) – USA (2 versions) 
More Great Hits From The Bachelors (1965) – UK No. 15
The Bachelors Marie (with I Believe) (1965) – USA release No. 1
Hits of the 60's (1966) – UK No. 12
Bachelors' Girls (1966) – UK No. 24
Golden All Time Hits (1967) – UK No. 19
The World of The Bachelors (1968) – UK No. 8
The World of The Bachelors Vol.2 (1969) – UK No. 11
The World of The Bachelors Vol.3 (1969) – #?
25 Golden Greats (1979) – UK No. 38
I Believe – The Very Best of The Bachelors (2008) – UK No. 7 Irish Republic No. 2

This discography (mostly) only includes UK releases. Over 70 albums have been released in the UK.

No Arms Can Ever Hold You is a USA release (Stereo Edition: London Records PS 418, Mono Edition: London Records LL 3418)
The album contains the following songs:
A1) "No Arms Can Ever Hold You" (Crafer, Nebb – BMI) 3:02
A2) "Whistle Down The Wind" (Arnold – BMI) 2:15
A3) "I Do Adore Her" (Burgie – ASCAP) 3:15
A4) "Skip to My Lou (Arr. Martin, Blane – ASCAP) 2:08
A5) "Pennies From Heaven" (Burke, Johnston – ASCAP) 1:36
A6) "I'm Getting Sentimental Over You" (Washington, Bassman – ASCAP) 2:20
B1) "I'm Yours" (Mellin – BMI) 2:36
B2) "Mistakes" (Leslie, Nicholls – ASCAP) 2:34
B3) "With All My Heart" (Lynn, Lee – ASCAP) 2:55
B4) "The Saints" (Trad., Arr. Snider, Raymonde – BMI) 2:40
B5) "Far Far Away" (Kennedy – BMI) 2:28
B6) "If I Should Fall In Love Again" (Popplewell – ASCAP) 2:27

References

Other sources
 Sean Helferty and Raymond Refausse. Directory of Irish Archives. Dublin: Irish Academic Press, 1995.

External links
Con & Dec – The Bachelors Con & Dec's Official UK web-site
The Bachelors featuring John Stokes John Stokes' Official UK web-site
John Stokes – The Truth Con & Dec's version of the break-up and aftermath
YouTube: Original members performing 'Chapel in the Moonlight'
'Diane/I Believe' 'This Morning' July 2008 clip of 'Diane/I Believe' with Con and Dec

 
  Complete history 1962 – 1984 with UK/USA Discography

British Invasion artists
Beat groups
Musical groups established in 1957
Musical groups disestablished in 2022
London Records artists
Irish pop music groups
Musical groups from Dublin (city)
Irish musical trios
1957 establishments in Ireland
2022 disestablishments in Ireland